Shenyang Agricultural University is a university in Shenyang, Liaoning, China under the provincial government.

References

 
Universities and colleges in Shenyang
Agricultural universities and colleges in China